The 2013 La Manga Cup was an exhibition international club football (soccer) competition featuring football club teams from Europe, which was held in February 2013. All matches were played in La Manga Stadium in La Manga Club, Spain. This was the sixteenth La Manga Cup.

Teams 
The following eight clubs participated in the 2013 tournament:

  Aalesund
  Astra Giurgiu
  CSKA Moscow
  Kalmar
  Lillestrøm
  Nordsjælland
  Start
  Vålerenga

Standings 
With only six teams entered, the 2012 version of the Cup was contested in a Round Robin style format, wherein each participating team played against three of the other seven teams entered in the competition, with the winner determined by points earned.

Matches

Winners

References 

2013
2012–13 in Romanian football
2012–13 in Russian football
2012–13 in Danish football
2013 in Norwegian football
2013 in Swedish football